Kahramanmaraş, historically Marash and Germanicea, is a city in the Mediterranean region of Turkey and the administrative centre of Kahramanmaraş province. After 1973, Maraş was officially named Kahramanmaraş with the prefix kahraman (Turkish word meaning "hero") to commemorate the Battle of Marash. The city lies on a plain at the foot of Mount Ahır. The city is best known for its distinctive ice cream which is thick enough to cut with a knife and fork. 

Kahramanmaraş Airport has flights to İstanbul and Ankara.

On 6 February 2023, much of the city was destroyed in the 2023 Turkey–Syria earthquakes which had their epicentre in Pazarcık and Elbistan in Kahramanmaraş province.

History

Early history

In the early Iron Age (late 11th century BC to ca. 711 BC), Maraş was the capital city of the Syro-Hittite state Gurgum (Hieroglyphic Luwian Kurkuma). It was known as "the Kurkumaean city" to its Luwian inhabitants and as Marqas to the Assyrians. In 711 BC, the land of Gurgum was annexed as an Assyrian province and renamed Marqas after its capital.

Maraş was called Germanicia Caesarea (Germanikeia) in the time of the Roman and Byzantine empires, probably after Germanicus Julius Caesar rather than the German people. According to a 2010 Cumhuriyet article, the first ruins of Germanicia have already been unearthed in the Dulkadiroğulları quarters of the city.

Medieval period
During the Byzantine Empire, Germanikeia was seat of an eparch and one of the city's eparch participated in the First Council of Nicea. The city was lost to the Arabs in the 7th century and during the rule of al-Mansur the whole Christian population of the Germanikeia valley was deported and resettled at Ramla in Palestine. After the fall of the Armenian kingdoms in the 11th century the city became an important stronghold for the exiled Armenians and the city became the capital of the short-lived principality of Philaretos Brachamios that at times included Antioch and Edessa.

After Philaretos' death, another Armenian general named Tatoul took over the city and hosted the exhausted army of the First Crusade for four days before it moved on to the Siege of Antioch. According to the Chronicle of Matthew of Edessa, it was destroyed by an earthquake and 40,000 people were killed on the 12th of the month of Mareri in the Armenian year 563 (November 29,  1114). In 1100, the city was captured by the Danishmends, followed by the Seljuks in 1103. In 1107, Crusaders led by Tancred retook it with aid from Toros I of Little Armenia. In 1135, the Danishmends besieged Germanikeia unsuccessfully, but captured it the next year. However, the Crusaders retook it in 1137.

Kaykhusraw I, Sultan of Rum captured Marash in 1208. Seljuk rule lasted to 1258, when Marash was captured by the Armenian Kingdom of Cilicia, following the war with the Ilkhanate. Served by an Armenian Apostolic Church archbishop, it became for a very short period of time, the seat of the Catholicossate of the Great House of Cilicia. Marash was captured by Al-Ashraf Khalil, Mamluk Sultan, in 1292. It was recaptured by Hethum II, King of Cilician Armenia, in 1299. Marash was finally taken by the Mamluks in 1304.

Marash was ruled by Dulkadirs as vassals of the Mamluks from 1337–1515 before being annexed to the Ottoman Empire. In the early days of Ottoman rule (1525–6) there were 1,557 adult males (total population 7,500); at this time all the inhabitants were Muslims, but later a substantial number of non-Muslims migrated to the city, mainly in the 19th century.

Modern period
During Ottoman rule, the city was initially the centre of Eyalet of Dulkadir (also called Eyalet of Zûlkâdiriyye) and then an administrative centre of a sanjak in the Vilayet of Aleppo.

After the First World War, Marash was controlled by British troops between 22 February 1919 and 30 October 1919, then by French troops, after the Armistice of Mudros. It was taken over by the Turkish National Movement after the Battle of Marash on 13 February 1920. Afterward a massacre of Armenian civilians took place. Roving Turkish bands threw kerosene-doused rags on Armenian homes and laid a constant barrage upon the American relief hospital. The Armenians themselves, as in previous times of trouble, sought refuge in their churches and schools. Women and children found momentary shelter in Marash's six Armenian Apostolic and three Armenian Evangelical churches, and in the city's sole Catholic cathedral. All the churches, and eventually the entire Armenian districts, were set alight. When the 2,000 Armenians who had taken shelter in the Catholic cathedral attempted to leave, they were shot. Early reports put the number of Armenians dead at no less than 16,000, although this was later revised down to 5,000–12,000.

In 1973, Marash's name was changed to Kahramanmaraş when the Turkish government added "Kahraman" to the name, in reference to the resistance to the French occupation after the First World War. Kahraman means "heroic" or “brave” in Turkish.

In December 1978, the Maraş Massacre of leftist Alevis took place in the city. A Turkish nationalist group, the Grey Wolves, incited the violence that left more than 100 dead. The incident was important in the Turkish government's decision to declare martial law, and the eventual military coup in 1980.

In February 2023, a powerful 7.8 magnitude earthquake struck near Kahramanmaraş, causing widespread damage to the city.

Ecclesiastical history

Geography 
The city center is 568 meters above sea level. Ceyhan River, which originates from the mountains surrounding Elbistan Plain is the most important hydrological feature in the city.

Climate 
Kahramanmaraş has a Mediterranean climate (Köppen: Csa, Trewartha: Cs) with continental influences from the surrounding northern areas. Summers are very hot and dry with a daytime average of 35 °C (95 °F) but temperatures can reach 40 °C (104 °F) quite easily. The highest recorded temperature is 45.2 °C (113.3 °F) on 30 July 2007. Winters are cool and wet with daytime temperatures typically in the 5-10 °C (40-50 °F) range. The coldest temperature recorded is -9.6 °C (14.7 °F) on 6 February 1997.

Demographics

In 1904, Mark Sykes recorded Marash as a city inhabited by Armenians and Turks. In 1913, the town was home to 45 thousand Turks and 30 thousand Armenians, while other ethnic groups had very small representation. The population of the province was 1,112,634 as of 2017, including 513,582 in the city.

The Armenian population of Maraş, like many other Armenian communities in Turkey, suffered greatly during the Armenian genocide. One of deportation control centres, Maraş was the site of massacres and deportations of Armenians, who were subjected to violence, harassment, looting and appropriation of property, and were forced to flee. During the Turkish War of Independence, the French army occupied Maraş, and some Armenians returned to the city. However, in February 1920, Turkish nationalist forces attacked the city, resulting in a massacre of the Armenian population. Those who were not killed fled the city. Today, there are almost no remaining Armenians in Kahramanmaraş, which transformed into a conservative city predominantly populated by Turkish Muslims.

Industry
 

Several internationally known ice cream companies, like MADO, Yaşar Pastanesi, EDO and Ferah Pastanesi, started their business in Kahramanmaraş, and thousands of people visit the city because of its ice cream (dondurma in Turkish).

Sports
At  elevation, the nearby Yedikuyular Ski Resort offers winter sports activities.

Notable natives
 Leo III - Byzantine emperor (717 - June 18, 741)
 Nestorius - 5th century religious leader
 Gülbahar Hatun - consort of Sultan Bayezid II and the mother of Sultan Selim I of the Ottoman Empire
 Veysi Kaynak - Turkish politician from the Justice and Development Party (AKP) who currently serves as a Deputy Prime Minister of Turkey 
 Mahir Ünal - Turkish politician and academic from the Justice and Development Party (AKP) who served as the Minister of Culture and Tourism
 Ben Bagdikian - Armenian-American journalist, news media critic and commentator
 Emine Hatun - principal consort of Sultan Mehmed I of the Ottoman Empire
 Serdar Bilgili - Turkish businessman
 Soner Sarikabadayi - Turkish singer
 Necip Fazıl Kısakürek - Turkish poet and writer
 Hasibe Eren - Turkish actor
 Şeref Eroğlu - European and World champion and Olympic medalist wrestler
 George E. White - American missionary and witness to the Armenian Genocide
 Necmettin Hacıeminoğlu, Turkish writer

See also

 Anatolian Tigers
 Cilicia War
 Domuztepe
 Dulkadiroğlu, Kahramanmaraş
 Onikişubat
 Kahramanmaraş Sütçüimam University (KSU)

References

External links

Kahramanmaraş Sütçüimam University
Kahramanmaraş Official Government Website
Kahramanmaraş Town Office Website

 
Populated places in Kahramanmaraş Province
Recipients of the Medal of Independence with Red Ribbon (Turkey)
Districts of Kahramanmaraş Province
Aleppo vilayet
Crusade places
Roman sites in Turkey